Gábor Scheiring (born March 14, 1981) is a Hungarian economist and politician, member of the National Assembly (MP) from Politics Can Be Different (LMP) National List between 2010 and 2014.

He graduated from the Corvinus University of Budapest. He was a leading member of the Védegylet which nominated László Sólyom to the position President of Hungary in 2005. He is an organizer and instructor of the Ökofeszt since 2005. He was one of the founders of the LMP in Spring 2009. He is responsible for the party's economic policy. He was a candidate as PM for Pestszentlőrinc (Budapest Constituency XXVII) in the 2010 national election. He was elected to the National Assembly from the LMP's National List. He was a member of the Economic and Information Technology Committee since May 14, 2010.

In January 2013, the LMP's congress rejected against the electoral cooperation with other opposition forces, including Together 2014. As a result, members of LMP's “Dialogue for Hungary” platform, including Scheiring, announced their decision to leave the opposition party and form a new organization. Benedek Jávor said he eight MPs leaving LMP would keep their parliamentary mandates. The leaving MPs established Dialogue for Hungary as a full-fledged party.

References

1981 births
Living people
Hungarian economists
LMP – Hungary's Green Party politicians
Dialogue for Hungary politicians
Members of the National Assembly of Hungary (2010–2014)
Politicians from Budapest
Corvinus University of Budapest alumni
Alumni of Hughes Hall, Cambridge